Ketzerbachtal is a former municipality in the district of Meißen, in Saxony, Germany. Since 1 January 2014, it is part of the town Nossen.

References 

Meissen (district)
Former municipalities in Saxony